Philiris marginata is a species of butterfly of the family Lycaenidae. It is found in Yos Sudarso Bay in Western New Guinea.

References

Butterflies described in 1894
Luciini